Halakilangi Muagututia (born June 28, 1978) is a former American football defensive back who played one season with the Chicago Rush of the Arena Football League. He first enrolled at Mt. San Antonio College before transferring to the University of Texas at El Paso. He played for various professional teams in several different leagues between 1999 and 2005.

College career

Mt. San Antonio College
Muagututia first played college football for the Mt. SAC Mounties.

University of Texas at El Paso
Muagututia played for the UTEP Miners from 1996 to 1997. He earned First Team All-WAC Mountain Division honors in 1997.

Professional career

Mobile Admirals
Muagututia played for the Mobile Admirals of the short-lived Regional Football League in 1999.

Los Angeles Dragons
Muagututia played for the Los Angeles Dragons of the short-lived Spring Football League in 2000.

Chicago Enforcers
Muagututia was selected by the Chicago Enforcers of the XFL with the 441st pick in the XFL Draft and played in four games for them in 2001.

Mobile Wizards
Muagututia played for the Mobile Wizards of the af2 in 2002.

Chicago Rush
Muagututia was signed by the Chicago Rush on November 14, 2002. He was released by the Rush on March 31, 2003.

Las Vegas Gladiators
Muagututia was signed to the Las Vegas Gladiators' practice squad on April 23, 2003.

Central Valley Coyotes
Muagututia played in nine games for the Central Valley Coyotes of af2 during the 2004 season, recording 27 tackles. He asked for, and was granted, his release from the Coyotes in June 2004 due to feeling he could play at a higher level if he switched teams.

Hawaiian Islanders
Muagututia was signed by the Hawaiian Islanders of af2 in June 2004.

Central Valley Coyotes
Muagututia played for the Central Valley Coyotes in 2005.

References

External links
Just Sports Stats

Living people
1978 births
Players of American football from California
American football defensive backs
Mt. SAC Mounties football players
UTEP Miners football players
Chicago Enforcers players
Mobile Wizards players
Chicago Rush players
Central Valley Coyotes players
Hawaiian Islanders players
Sportspeople from Los Angeles County, California
Regional Football League players